Michael James "Mickey" Evans (born 1 January 1973) is a former professional footballer who played as a forward. He spent most of his career with Plymouth Argyle, for whom he scored 73 goals in 384 appearances in the Football League. He also played in the Premier League for Southampton and the Football League for West Bromwich Albion, Bristol Rovers and Torquay United. Born in England, Evans earned one cap for the Republic of Ireland at full international level.

Club career

Plymouth Argyle
Evans originally joined Plymouth Argyle in December 1987 as an associate schoolboy. He made his first team debut in December 1990 at the age of 17, and signed his first professional contract in March 1991.

He was a member of Neil Warnock's Plymouth side which won promotion from the Third Division via the play-offs in 1996. Following that success, in March 1997 he was signed by Graeme Souness at Southampton for £650,000.

Southampton
Souness signed Evans to add a bit of muscle to the forward line as Southampton entered the final lap of a desperate fight to avoid relegation from the Premier League in the 1996–97 season.

He was a big and brave striker and scored four crucial goals as Saints beat the drop, finishing in 16th position. His greatest game in a Saints shirt came at Nottingham Forest's City Ground, where he scored a brace. For the second goal, he sprinted from the half-way line, taking a pass from Eyal Berkovic to beat goalkeeper Mark Crossley who could only half block the shot.

He followed this up with two more goals against West Ham United and Coventry City, and his form in April 1997 was such that he was awarded the Premiership Player-of-the-Month Trophy.

Evans became somewhat of a cult figure amongst Southampton fans which many of them making a tongue-in-cheek reference to his West Country roots by wearing straw hats and having straw hanging from their mouths as well as donning fake versions of Evans' then trademark bushy sideburns. Saints fans attributed their Premier League survival solely to Evans' goals and performances during that period.

The following season, Souness had been replaced as Saints' manager by Dave Jones and Evans lost his place to Kevin Davies. Although he was to make a handful of appearances in the 1997–98 season, his career at The Dell only lasted just over six months and in October 1997 he moved on to West Bromwich Albion for a fee of £750,000.

A few days before his transfer to The Hawthorns, he won a Republic of Ireland cap against Romania.

West Bromwich Albion and Bristol Rovers
Evans made his Albion debut on 29 November 1997, coming on as a late substitute in a 1–0 defeat away at Middlesbrough. Used mainly as a substitute during 1997–98, it took him 12 games to register his first goal for the club, scoring in a 2–0 win at Swindon Town on 7 February 1998. Evans' time at West Brom was frequently blighted by injury and illness. It wasn't until his later return to Plymouth when it was discovered that Evans had an asthmatic-related complaint which had contributed to his lack of form and fitness. He was loaned out to Bristol Rovers, a successful spell which led to a £250,000 permanent deal being struck in September 2000.

Back to Argyle
After an unsuccessful spell at Bristol Rovers, Evans then returned to Plymouth Argyle as one of the first signings of Paul Sturrock, joining on transfer deadline day 2001 for £30,000.

Although not a prolific goalscorer, after the diagnosis of his condition, the now healthier Evans played an important role in the Pilgrims' recent success; in particular his hold-up play and lay-offs created numerous goalscoring opportunities for his teammates. He scored the opening goal in Argyle's 4–1 Third Division Championship match sealing victory at Darlington in the 2001–02 season.

He was named Argyle's "Player of the Year" during their title-winning Division Two campaign in 2003–04. He scored the opening goal in the 2–0 home victory over Q.P.R which was decisive in confirming Plymouth Argyle as that season's Division Two champions.

The 33-year-old Plymothian announced his decision to leave Plymouth Argyle, saying "the time is right for me to move on", with effect from the Pilgrims' final Championship game of the season on 30 April 2006.

Evans scored the winning goal with a diving header in his last appearance for Plymouth Argyle against Ipswich Town, to secure the club a 14th-place finish in the Football League Championship (the highest finish for the club in two decades) and forever sealing his status as a Plymouth Argyle "legend" amongst the club's fans.

Final year and retirement
On 18 May 2006, Evans signed on a free transfer for local rivals Torquay United, where he scored once against Bury. On 24 November 2006, he decided to retire from professional football, a decision coinciding with a period of deep unrest among Torquay United's players.

International career
Evans' only cap for the Republic of Ireland national football team was against Romania in a 1998 World Cup Qualifier at Lansdowne Road on 11 October 1997. He was a second-half substitute and came on in the 85th minute to replace Tony Cascarino.

Personal life
Evans attended St Boniface's Catholic College and played Junior football for Prince Rock Youth during his schools days. He is nicknamed "Trigger" after a character from Only Fools and Horses. During his second spell with his hometown club he set up his building company MJ Evans. In 2007 and 2008, having retired from playing, Evans was involved in a series of testimonial events to raise money for five local charities. In July 2012, the company filed for administration.

Career statistics

Honours
Plymouth Argyle
Football League Third Division play-offs: 1996
Football League Third Division: 2001–02
Football League Second Division: 2003–04

Individual
Premier League Player of the Month: April 1997
Plymouth Argyle Player of the Year: 2003–04

See also
 List of Republic of Ireland international footballers born outside the Republic of Ireland

References

External links

1973 births
Living people
Footballers from Plymouth, Devon
Republic of Ireland association footballers
Republic of Ireland international footballers
Association football forwards
Plymouth Argyle F.C. players
Blackburn Rovers F.C. players
Southampton F.C. players
West Bromwich Albion F.C. players
Bristol Rovers F.C. players
Torquay United F.C. players
English Football League players
Premier League players
People educated at St Boniface's Catholic College